WKWX (93.5 FM, "93 WKWX") is a radio station licensed to serve Savannah, Tennessee, United States. The station is owned by Melco, Inc. It airs a country music format.

The station was assigned the WKWX call letters by the Federal Communications Commission on June 19, 1980.

References

External links

KWX
Country radio stations in the United States
Hardin County, Tennessee